Rob Harris (born December 4, 1953) is an American ice hockey player. He competed in the men's tournament at the 1976 Winter Olympics. Harris also won a national championship with Minnesota in 1974.

References

1953 births
Living people
American men's ice hockey players
Minnesota Golden Gophers men's ice hockey players
Olympic ice hockey players of the United States
Ice hockey players at the 1976 Winter Olympics
Sportspeople from Omaha, Nebraska
Ice hockey people from Nebraska
NCAA men's ice hockey national champions